JoBeth Lillian Coleby-Davis (born 17 July 1984) is a Bahamian Progressive Liberal Party politician and attorney who has been the Bahamian Minister of Housing and Transport since 23 September 2021 and the Member of Parliament (MP) for Elizabeth since 6 October 2021. Coleby-Davis defeated the FNM incumbent Duane Sands in the 2021 general election. She previously served in the Senate from 2017 to 2021.

Early life
Coleby-Davis was born in Freeport, Grand Bahama to Irma (née Bootle) and Wayde Coleby. She is the granddaughter of Granville Coleby and the niece of Edwin Coleby. She attended Walker Primary School. Her family relocated to the United States and then again to the Turks and Caicos where she finished her secondary education at Clement Howell High School. She pursued an Associate Degree in Law and Criminal Justice at the College of the Bahamas. She then took her studies to the United Kingdom, graduating with a dual Bachelor of Laws with Business Management from Keele University in 2009. She took a bar vocational course at Nottingham Trent University the following year before going on to graduate with a Master of Laws in Energy Law and Policy from the University of Dundee.

Career
Coleby-Davis was called to the Bar of England and Wales and the Bar of the Bahamas. She provided legal counseling to ScotiaBank and the Bahamas Petroleum Company. She sat on the board Real Property Tax Appeal Tribunal and participated in the amnesty programme.

Coleby-Davis was appointed and sworn in as a Senator in 2017, when the PLP was in opposition. She accused the FNM government of being out of touch with millennial Bahamians. In October 2020, she announced she would seek the PLP nomination for Elizabeth for the next election. She was ratified in February 2021. She unseated FNM incumbent Duane Sands in the 2021 general election.  

After winning the election, she was appointed to be the Minister of Transport and Housing under the new prime minister, Philip "Brave" Davis Coleby-Davis was officially sworn into parliament on 6 October 2021. During the opening of parliament, she seconded the nomination of Patricia Deveaux to become speaker of the House of Assembly of the Bahamas.

References

External links
PLP profile

Living people
1984 births
Alumni of Keele University
Alumni of Nottingham Trent University
Alumni of the University of Dundee
Bahamian lawyers
Members of the House of Assembly of the Bahamas
Members of the Senate of the Bahamas
Progressive Liberal Party politicians
University of the Bahamas alumni
21st-century Bahamian women politicians
21st-century Bahamian politicians
Women government ministers of the Bahamas